Tim Ford is an Australian former freestyle swimmer.

Ford grew up in Sydney, attending Turramurra High School. Due to the distance he lived from the swimming facility he trained at, he would often board with swimmer Shane Gould.

A graduate of Harvard University, Ford was captain of the varsity swim team during his time in Cambridge.

In 1982, Ford won a silver medal in the 1500 metre freestyle at the 1982 Commonwealth Games in Brisbane, finishing behind Max Metzker. He also competed in that year's World Championships in Ecuador.

Ford, a Swimming Australia board member, is married to former swimmer Susie Baumer.

References

External links

Year of birth missing (living people)
Living people
Australian male freestyle swimmers
Swimmers from Sydney
Harvard Business School alumni
Harvard Crimson men's swimmers
Commonwealth Games silver medallists for Australia
Commonwealth Games medallists in swimming
Medallists at the 1982 Commonwealth Games
Swimmers at the 1982 Commonwealth Games